Mis Canciones Preferidas is a compilation album by the Puerto Rican singer Yolandita Monge. It was released in 1986 and it includes selected hits from the studio albums Fantasía, Historia de Amour, Sueños, and Luz de Luna. No new songs or unreleased tracks appear here. 

The album was reissued on CD again in 1992 and is currently out of print in all media formats.

Track listing

Notes
Vocals: Yolandita Monge
Track listing and credits from album cover.
Released in Cassette Format on 1986 (DIC-10433).
Released in CD Format on 1986 (CBS-450415-2/DIDP-10698).
Re-released in CD Format (Serie De Oro) on 1992 (CDB-80812).

Charts

References

Yolandita Monge albums
1986 compilation albums